Mohamed Yudhi Purnomo (12 July 1962 – 15 February 2019) was an Indonesian sprinter. He competed in the men's 100 metres, 200 metres, and the 4 × 100 metres relay at the 1984 Summer Olympics.

Competition record

References

External links
 

1962 births
2019 deaths
Athletes (track and field) at the 1984 Summer Olympics
Indonesian male sprinters
Olympic athletes of Indonesia
Sportspeople from Central Java
People from Banyumas Regency
Deaths from cancer in Indonesia
20th-century Indonesian people
21st-century Indonesian people
Southeast Asian Games medalists in athletics
Southeast Asian Games silver medalists for Indonesia
Southeast Asian Games bronze medalists for Indonesia
Competitors at the 1983 Southeast Asian Games